Danmarks Modigste is a Danish reality show in which 16 people from all over Denmark compete in challenges that requires courage in order to pass challenges in order to be safe from elimination. The grand prize is kr.500,000. The show premiered on March 13, 2017 on TV3.

Seasons

External links
http://www.tv3.dk/danmarks-modigste

Danish reality television series
2010s Danish television series
2017 Danish television series debuts
Danish-language television shows
TV3 (Denmark) original programming